Pakpattan is a city in Punjab, Pakistan.

Pakpattan may also refer to:
Pakpattan District, a district of Punjab (Pakistan)
Pakpattan Tehsil, a tehsil of district Pakpattan

See also
Pakpattan railway station, a railway station in Pakistan
Pakpattan Canal, canal in Pakistan
Pakpatan Hydropower Plant, a small hydropower plant in Pakistan